New Millport is an unincorporated community in Clearfield County, Pennsylvania, United States. New Millport has a post office, with ZIP code 16861.

References

Unincorporated communities in Clearfield County, Pennsylvania
Unincorporated communities in Pennsylvania